A list of films produced by the Bollywood film industry based in Mumbai in 1989:

Top-grossing films

1989 A-Z

References

External links 
 Bollywood films of 1989 at the Internet Movie Database

1989
Lists of 1989 films by country or language
Films, Bollywood